FC Kairat-Zhastar is a Kazakhstani football club based in Almaty.

History 
The club was formed as FC Tsesna in 2010 to play in First Division. In December 2011, it was acquired by FC Kairat due to having one of the best football academy in country. They started season 2012 with its current name

Name history
2010 : Founded as Tsesna
2012 : Renamed Kairat-Akademiya
2019 : Renamed Kairat-Zhastar

League results

References

External links
Page at KFF website

Association football clubs established in 2010
Football clubs in Almaty
FC Kairat
2010 establishments in Kazakhstan
Football clubs in Kazakhstan